Middle College High School is an alternative high school of the Los Angeles Unified School District, located in Los Angeles, California. The school serves approximately 340 students.

External links 
School Demographics
School Profile

Los Angeles Unified School District schools
Los Angeles Unified School District
High schools in Los Angeles
Public high schools in California
Alternative schools in California